The 2008–09 European Challenge Cup was the 13th season of the European Challenge Cup, the annual rugby union European club competition for clubs from six nations in European rugby. It started in October 2008 and ended with the final at the Twickenham Stoop in London on 22 May 2009, in which Northampton Saints defeated Bourgoin 15–3. With the win, the Saints not only claimed the trophy, but also won a berth in the 2009–10 Heineken Cup.

Teams
Seven French teams competed instead of the normal eight, as a French team, Toulouse, progressed farther in the previous year's Heineken Cup than any English or Italian team.

Other nations had their usual number of participants: England six, Italy four, Ireland one, Spain one and Romania one.

Pool stage

The draw for the pool stages took place on 23 June 2008. The draw was conducted using the ERC European Ranking system which was based on the qualified teams' performances and participation in the Heineken Cup and knock-out stages of the European Challenge Cup over the past four seasons.

{| class="wikitable"
|+ Key to colours
|-
| style="background: #ccffcc;" |     
| Winner of each pool, advance to quarterfinals. Seed # in parentheses
|-
| style="background: #ccccff;" |     
| Three highest-scoring second-place teams advance to quarterfinals. Seed # in parentheses
|}

Pool 1

Pool 2

Pool 3

Pool 4

Pool 5

Seeding and runners-up

Knockout stage
Unlike the Heineken Cup, the Challenge Cup did not conduct a semi-final draw at the time (such a draw would be instituted for the 2009–10 edition). The top half of the draw matched the 1 and 8 seeds in one quarter-final, and the 4 and 5 seeds in the other, and the bottom half matched 2 against 7 and 3 against 6; the higher (lower-numbered) seeds all play at home. The knockout stage was not reseeded after the quarter-finals. Home advantage for the semi-finals was awarded to the highest remaining seed in each half of the draw. Home advantage in the final went to the top remaining seed.

Quarter-finals

Semi-finals

Final

See also
2008–09 Heineken Cup

Notes and references

External links
2008–09 European Challenge Cup Official Site

 
2007-08
2008–09 rugby union tournaments for clubs
2008–09 in European rugby union
2008–09 in Irish rugby union
2008–09 in English rugby union
2008–09 in Spanish rugby union
2008–09 in French rugby union
2008–09 in Italian rugby union
2008–09 in Romanian rugby union